Madame Zodiac is a fictional character, a comic book witch published by DC Comics. She debuted in Batman Family #17 (April 1978), and was created by Bob Rozakis and Don Heck.

Publication history
Madame Zodiac first appears in Batman Family #17 (April 1978) and later returned in issue #18. She returned four years later in World's Finest Comics #285 (November 1982) in a four issue story ending in issue #288. The character is resurrected twenty-seven years later by Kurt Busiek, Fabian Nicieza, and Mike Norton in issue #12 of the fifty-two issue Trinity maxi-series (August 20, 2008), and has cameos in issues #15 (September 10, 2008), and #49 (May 9, 2009) with an offpanel mention on the third page of issue #52 (May 27, 2009). Madame Zodiac returns in Batgirls #13 (February 2023).

Fictional character biography

Batman Family

Madame Zodiac is first introduced as a "crime broker" for two Gotham City criminals in Batman Family #17; in the story she sells her services to Poison Ivy and Catwoman, in a role similar to that of the Calculator (Noah Kuttler). Madame Zodiac promises both the criminals that they will come into conflict with the Earth-Two Huntress (Helena Wayne), Batwoman (Kathy Kane), and Batgirl (Barbara Gordon), while in the commission of their crimes, but they would succeed. At the end of the story Poison Ivy and Catwoman are defeated but Madame Zodiac evades capture after stealing a powerful mystical artifact; this apparently had been her plan all along.

She later returned in Batman Family #18. She masterminds an assault on the Pentagon, in order to take advantage of the mystical energy generated by a foreseen planetary conjunction. She is able to tap into the energies by focusing them within the largest man-made pentagram on earth, the Pentagon. She uses her new powers to subdue the United States Pentagon Police detail tasked with defending the facility. She is outwitted by Batgirl, who tricks her into destroying the walls of the pentagon courtyard thereby cutting off the source of her power, and enabling Batgirl to capture her.

World's Finest Comics

In issue #285, Batman begins to experience strange blackouts, and Superman experiences a prophetic dream in which he witnesses Batman lying on an altar beneath the Zodiac Idol of Doctor Zodiac. Superman briefs Batman on his vision, but when he uses his X-ray vision to check on Doctor Zodiac he notices that the criminal is still in prison. The issue reintroduces Madame Zodiac and reveals her first name to be Marissa, while also reintroducing Doctor Zodiac (Theodore Carrigan). Madame Zodiac reveals to Doctor Zodiac that she has begun testing Batman, and that she believes that Bruce Wayne is Batman. Superman and Batman consult with Zatanna and give her a couple of Doctor Zodiac's mystical Zodiac Coins hoping that she can use them to track down the Zodiac Idol. Zatanna loses control the moment she touches the coins, and mentions a "dark cloud" before eventually lapsing into a coma.

In issue #286, Wonder Woman takes Zatanna away to Paradise Island for medical treatment, and Madame Zodiac reveals that she freed Doctor Zodiac from prison and left a mystical illusion in his place. She freed him because she had his Zodiac Idol, but wanted access to the Zodiac Coins that provide its power. She uses Doctor Zodiac's mystical connection to the twelve Atlantean coins to steal them from the coin collectors who currently own them. Now possessing all twelve coins she is able to activate the Zodiac Idol. It is also revealed that Theo (Doctor Zodiac) and Marissa (Madame Zodiac) are now romantically involved. Theo discovers that she has used the Zodiac Idol to contact an ancient other-dimensional evil she refers to as her "master". Meanwhile, a dark cloud begins appearing all over the United States in various cities including Metropolis and Gotham City. Everywhere the cloud appears it inspires hate crimes, including the defilement of a Jewish synagogue, and the near lynching of Lucius Fox. Meanwhile, Theo (Doctor Zodiac) is becoming concerned as Madame Zodiac's shadowy master grows in power. Elsewhere, Green Arrow (Oliver Queen) confronts a werewolf, and Hawkman (Katar Hol) defeats what appears to be a vampire. An unstoppable phalanx of zombies attack a GCPD barricade in Gotham City, but are stopped by Superman. At the end of the issue, Madame Zodiac states that her master is now powerful enough to possess his chosen host's body.

In issue #287, the shadowy force of Madame Zodiac's master attempts to dominate and possess Batman's mind and body. Doctor Zodiac begins looking for a way out of his predicament; he decides against releasing a mysterious prisoner being held at their location, a prisoner whom Madame Zodiac fears. He relents out of fears for his own safety. Superman checks in with Wonder Woman and she reports that Zatanna is responding well to Purple Healing Ray treatments and is recovering from her coma. In Gotham City, shadow minions sent by Madame Zodiac are able to capture Batman while her master attacks his mind; he is brought through a portal to her hidden location.

Finally in issue #288, on Paradise Island in the Bermuda Triangle, Zatanna reveals that touching the Zodiac Coins transported her astrally to the dark cloud's location where the other-dimensional demon nearly killed her. Meanwhile, the being whom Madame Zodiac refers to as the "Adored One", a shadowy cloud in a crystal sphere floating above Batman's body, releases tendrils that enter Batman's nose and mouth. Doctor Zodiac runs away after witnessing this tableau, finally determined to release the mysterious prisoner, but is unable to do so due to his total lack of magical ability. Meanwhile, Batman is possessed and magical duplicates of him are created for when the Adored One burns out his host body. Superman is teleported to their location after chasing one of the Adored One's werewolf minions through a portal. The possessed Batman briefly spars with Superman who uses his X-ray vision to discover that Batman's body is dying. Superman uses Super-Hypnosis to free Batman's mind, causing him to expel the "shadow demon" from his nose and mouth. Madame Zodiac is subdued by Superman, and Doctor Zodiac tells him about the mysterious prisoner. Superman shatters the walls of the magically sealed cell, revealing the real Madame Zodiac chained to a wall. The Madame Zodiac that Doctor Zodiac had fallen in love with was a magical clone. Madame Zodiac reveals that she was attacked and possessed by the shadow demon while astrally exploring other dimensions; the creature used the Gemini aspect of the Zodiac Idol to create her evil duplicate. Madame Zodiac, Doctor Zodiac, and Superman confront the duplicate and its master. Madame Zodiac's body is apparently utterly destroyed by her evil duplicate, and both the duplicate and Doctor Zodiac are slain by the duplicate's nameless master. The master then has its superpowered Batman clones attack Superman and Batman. Superman discovers that the clones will self-destruct after extreme physical exertion, and Batman uses the Zodiac Idol to destroy the master's containment sphere, apparently dispersing it. The story ends with the duo leaving for a cup of coffee.

Trinity

A woman claiming to be the original Madame Zodiac reappears in Trinity #12 (August 2008). The story has the Riddler (Edward Nigma) consulting with Madame Zodiac in order to uncover the secret behind a pattern of mysterious thefts; while there an antique gargoyle from Castle Branek (home of Morgaine le Fey) comes to life and attempts to kill him. Madame Zodiac destroys the statue and adds its cost to her fee. She has two more minor appearances in issues 15 and 49, and a final off-panel mention in issue #52 where it is revealed that she "works both sides of the street too often to socialize with either one".

Newspaper strip
In the Batman newspaper strip in 1967, an earlier Madame Zodiac was introduced in the story "Cheap gunman" where Pretty Boy Floy employs his sister Flo to impersonate Madame Zodiac, the personal astrologer to a billionaire industrialist Tyrone Koom, in order to convince the businessman to turn his company over to Pretty Boy.

References

External links
Batman Family Index
Robot9: The Annotated Trinity
Wizarduniverse: Kurt Busiek Talks 'Trinity' (January 18, 2009) 
io9: Our Interview With Trinity Creator Kurt Busiek (May 31, 2009)

Characters created by Don Heck
Comics characters introduced in 1978
DC Comics characters who use magic
DC Comics female superheroes
DC Comics female supervillains
DC Comics witches